Kansit Premthanakul, born 11 October 1991) is a Thai professional footballer who plays as a forward for Thai League 2 club Rajpracha.

Honour
Nongbua Pitchaya
 Thai League 2: 2020–21

External links

1991 births
Living people
Kansit Premthanakul
Kansit Premthanakul
Kansit Premthanakul
Kansit Premthanakul
Association football forwards
Kansit Premthanakul
Kansit Premthanakul
Kansit Premthanakul
Kansit Premthanakul
Kansit Premthanakul